Triangle 54 is a  public park located in the Blissville neighborhood of Long Island City in Queens, New York City. This traffic triangle is bound by 48th Street on the southwest and east, and 54th Avenue on the north. The park contains ten trees and a memorial flagstaff in its center that dates to 1930. On its granite base is inscribed, "Erected by the citizens of Laurel Hill in memory of those who died in the World War." Laurel Hill is an old name for this area, which once had its own railroad station. The name still appears on the map in Laurel Hill Boulevard, which runs a few blocks to the north of this site.

In the years after World War II, that war was added to the inscription, along with the Korean War and Vietnam War.

References

External links
Laurel Hill Flagstaff, New York City Department of Parks and Recreation

Long Island City
Parks in Queens, New York